Vanness Wu (born August 7, 1978) is a Taiwanese-American singer and actor. He is a member of the Taiwanese boyband F4 and the Korean Mandopop duo Kangta & Vanness.

Early life
Wu was born in Santa Monica, California. He learned to breakdance as a teenager and competed in numerous dance competitions throughout the 90s.

Career

Early career with F4

Wu starred as Mei Zuo (美作), one of the F4 members, in the Taiwanese drama series Meteor Garden and its sequel, Meteor Garden II. At the conclusion of the series, they continued to perform together and released three studio albums as the boy band F4. In 2002, Wu became the second F4 member, after Vic Chou, to release his debut solo album, Body Will Sing. The track, "I Hate Myself" is listed at number 95 on Hit Fm Taiwan's Hit Fm Annual Top 100 Singles Chart for 2002. The album was awarded as one of the "Top 10 Selling Mandarin Albums of the Year" at the 2002 IFPI Hong Kong Album Sales Awards, presented by the Hong Kong branch of IFPI.

In 2003, he was featured on Beyoncé's single "Crazy in Love", featured on her album Dangerously in Love.

In 2004, Wu made his film debut in the Hong Kong film Star Runner and was nominated at the Hong Kong Film Awards for Best Newcomer.

In 2006, he collaborated with Korean singer Kangta, forming Kangta & Vanness. The duo released the album Scandal.

In 2008, Wu was announced as the opening act and special guest for Kanye West's "Glow in the Dark" concert in Shanghai. They performed the hit song “Good Life”

Solo career success and acting career
Wu has appeared in several Taiwanese dramas as well as motion pictures. In 2009, he starred as Ren Guang Xi in Autumn's Concerto, one of the highest-rated Taiwanese idol drama. He also released his first Japanese single "Only", which entered Top 10 of the Oricon Chart, as well as another single "I Don't Wanna Lose You".

In 2010, Wu became the executive producer for the television series Year of the Rain.

Wu's third Chinese solo album C'est La V was released July 2011 under Universal Music Taiwan. It features collaborations with international artistes such as Ryan Tedder from OneRepublic, as well as Bruno Mars and Justin Michael who wrote the track "Knockin".
 
Besides directing, producing, acting, and singing, Wu is also the creator/designer of his own jewelry line 3.V.O.7. He is also the creative director of Reebok (greater China division).

In 2012, Wu won the "Best Crossover Singer" at the 16th Chinese Global Music Charts.

In 2013, Wu joined Jiangsu TV's diving variety show Stars in Danger: The High Dive, and won the silver medal.

In January 2015, Wu was announced to be one of the judges of the talent show Asia's Got Talent, along with Indonesian-French singer Anggun, Canadian musician David Foster, and former Spice Girls member Melanie C, which aired from March to May on AXN Asia.

In July 2015, Wu returned to the Philippines after a decade of his first visit for the special show for the #LiveinLevis event sponsored by Levi's in line with the launch of the Women's Denim Collection for Fall 2015. Wu's performance was a way of thanking the brand's fans and style seekers.

In 2016, it was announced that Wu would star in his first Chinese television series The Princess Weiyoung alongside Tiffany Tang, playing the 5th century prince and then Emperor Tuoba Yu of the Northern Wei Dynasty. He was also in the science fiction film Pili Back. In the same year, he participated with his sister Melody in the third season of The Amazing Race China, based on CBS's reality program of the same name, where they were eliminated on the ninth leg and finished 4th.

In 2019. he starred in Ip Man 4: The Finale alongside Donnie Yen where he played Hartman Wu, a U.S. Marine Corps Staff Sergeant and Bruce Lee's student.

Filmography

Television series

Film

Variety and reality show

Discography

Studio album

Singles

With Kangta and Vanness 

 2006 – Scandal – Kangta & Vanness Collaboration

Other collaborations 
 Beyoncé – "Crazy in Love" (Asian releases only) [2004]
 Coco Lee – "Hip Hop Tonight" [2006]
 Brian Joo – "Everything to Me" [2010] – 3rd Wave Music – I WILL BE THERE Album – www.3rdwavemusic.org
 Sammi Cheng – "Forgiveness" (In both English and Chinese) [2010]
 Lee Junho – "Undefeated" [2012] (M/V)
 Avicii – "Levels" (Mandarin Version) [2013]
 David Foster, Anggun and Melanie C – "Let's Groove" (charity single for the victims of Nepal earthquake) [2015]
 Danson Tang, Selina Ren, Diamond Zhang, Madoka Yonezawa, Siwon, Yao Yao, Rainie Yang, Amber Kuo, Wayne Huang – "Blessing (Chinese edition)" [2015]

References

External links 

 
 

1978 births
Living people
Male actors from Santa Monica, California
American male film actors
American emigrants to Taiwan
American musicians of Taiwanese descent
F4 (band) members
Singers from California
Japanese-language singers of the United States
Musicians from Santa Monica, California
Pony Canyon artists
Taiwanese male film actors
Taiwanese male television actors
21st-century American male actors
American male television actors
Taiwanese idols
Korean-language singers of the United States
21st-century American male singers
21st-century American singers
The Amazing Race contestants